The Tokyo Anime Center (東京アニメセンター) is a facility that was created to market anime to residents of Japan and foreign visitors. The facility hosts events such as live radio interviews with creators, voice actors, and merchandising fairs. It once included the AKIBA 3DTheater. It dubs itself as "The definitive spot for anime and anime-related entertainment."

It was located on the fourth floor of the Akihabara UDX building near JR Akihabara Station.

In 2007, many promotional displays for the then-upcoming Rebuild of Evangelion movie were set up inside the Tokyo Anime Center, including life-size cardboard stand-ups of Rei Ayanami and interactive demos.

More permanent sections of the center contain merchandise from popular anime series, such as mugs, key chains, promotional fliers, mouse pads, etc.

The Center closed down on July 17, 2017, and was reopened on October 28, 2017, at DNP Plaza Shibuya.

References

External links
 Tokyo Anime Center

Anime clubs
Culture in Tokyo
Anime and manga museums in Japan
Museums in Tokyo
Buildings and structures in Shinjuku